Guy Carswell Ousley (July 14, 1910 – February 28, 1964) was an American Negro league shortstop in the 1930s.

Early life and career
A native of Valdosta, Georgia, Ousley made his Negro leagues debut in 1931 with the Chicago American Giants, and played the following season with the Louisville Black Caps and Memphis Red Sox. He died in Chicago, Illinois in 1964 at age 53. His previously unmarked grave was marked by the Negro Leagues Baseball Grave Marker Project in 2005.

References

Further reading
 Burley, Dan (March 29, 1930). "Phillips Lights Drop Championship in Overtime Game to Calumet High Five". The Chicago Defender. p.  
 Burley, Dan (December 14, 1935). "Backdoor Stuff: 'The Times of Yesteryear'; Diggin' in the Graveyard of the Past. The Chicago Defender. p. 19
 Burley, Dan (September 16, 1958). Dan Burley's The Ways of Sports..." The Chicago Tribune. p. 26  
 Defender staff (September 29, 1958). "Bethesda Flashes". The Chicago Defender. p. 22

External links
 and Baseball-Reference Black Baseball stats and [https://www.seamheads.com/NegroLgs/player.php?playerID=ousle01guy Seamheads

1910 births
1964 deaths
Chicago American Giants players
Louisville Black Caps players
Memphis Red Sox players
20th-century African-American sportspeople
Baseball infielders